Hayneedle is an online retail company based in Omaha, Nebraska with a focus on furnishings and decor. In 2016, Hayneedle was acquired by Jet.com, which later became a subsidiary of Walmart.

History 

Hayneedle began in 2002 when Doug Nielsen, Julie Mahloch and Mark Hasebroock purchased a single online store, Hammocks.com, from a llama farmer in rural Washington state. Over the next few years, the company opened more online stores, each focused on one particular type of product, developing a portfolio of sites focused on indoor and outdoor home furnishings, accents, and decor. In 2005, the company unified under the name NetShops, and continued its category expansion. By acquiring Duluth, Minn.-based Thralow, Inc. in 2006, the company gained properties Telescopes.com and Binoculars.com, and underwent an internal restructuring.

In 2009, the company rebranded as Hayneedle and further expanded its selection to include more items focused in the areas of office, kitchen, bedding, pet supplies, lighting, home storage, and home improvement, among others. In the spring of 2014, all 300+ sites previously in operation under Hayneedle, Inc. were rolled into hayneedle.com.

In 2016, Hayneedle was acquired by e-commerce retailer Jet.com and later became part of the Walmart family of brands. In 2017, Hayneedle launched an advertising campaign focusing on "the love of home."

References

External links
 Hayneedle official website
 Hayneedle Inc. company website

Companies based in Omaha, Nebraska
Online retailers of the United States
2002 establishments in Nebraska
Retail companies established in 2002
Internet properties established in 2002
2016 mergers and acquisitions
Walmart